The French Division 4 was the fourth tier in the French football pyramid from 1978 to 1993. Above it were the Division 1, Division 2, and Division 3. Although it was succeeded by the Championnat National 3, the Championnat National 2 became the new fourth division.

History 
Before the introduction of the Division 4, the Division d'Honneur of regional leagues was the fourth tier in France. Against the advice of these regional divisions, the French Football Federation introduced the D4 in 1978. 

In 1993, the Championnat National 3 replaced the Division 4. However, the Championnat National 2 became the new fourth tier in the French football league system.

Format 
The Division 4 followed the same system of being an "open" league as the Division 3, mixing together amateur clubs and reserve sides of professional clubs. The 112 teams were split into 8 geographic groups of 14 teams. At the end of the season, the best team from each respective group was promoted to the Division 3. The champion of each regional Division d'Honneur was promoted to the D4, while the bottom three of each group in the D4 were relegated.  

To determine a winner of the league, the Division 4 involved a play-off phase at the end of the season, in which the 8 group winners participated. A group stage with 2 groups of 4 teams was followed by a final to crown a winner.

Performances by team

See also 

 French Division 3 (1971–1993)

Notes

References

Bibliography 
 Championnat de France Division 4, FFF, 1993

Sports leagues established in 1978
Division 4
Division 4
Division 4
France
Sports leagues disestablished in 1993